Branchinecta brushi is a species of fairy shrimp found at an altitude of  in the Chilean Andes.

Distribution and discovery

The type specimens of B. brushi were collected on December 13, 1988 by Charles F. Brush during an attempt to break the world record for the world's highest SCUBA dive.

B. brushi was collected, along with some other species, from below  of ice. The specimens were stored in 70% ethanol at the Peabody Museum of Natural History and the United States National Museum for nearly 20 years before being re-examined; the species was eventually described in 2010, and given the specific epithet brushi to commemorate Brush.

Description
In common with other fairy shrimp, the males bear complex structures on their second antennae, which are used in mating. B. brushi closely resembles Branchinecta valchetana, from which it differs in the form of the antennae and the gonopods.

Ecology
Branchinecta brushi shares the record for the crustacean living at the highest altitude with the copepod Boeckella palustris, also found in the same pool. Crustaceans are rarely associated with life at high altitudes, but fairy shrimp such as B. brushi produce dormant cysts which are capable of surviving prolonged desiccation, and aid in dispersal. The closed nature of the water body probably reduces the risk of predation, allowing B. brushi to complete its life cycle.

References

Branchiopoda
Invertebrates of Chile
Crustaceans described in 2010